Branchinecta belki is a species of fairy shrimp in the family Branchinectidae. It is found in Central America.

The IUCN conservation status of Branchinecta belki is "CR", critically endangered. The species faces an extremely high risk of extinction in the immediate future. The IUCN status was reviewed in 2000.

References

Further reading

 

Anostraca
Articles created by Qbugbot
Crustaceans described in 1992